Carmel School, FRI, Digwadih is managed by the members of The Order of the Sisters of Our Lady of Mount Carmel or Carmelites. The school is affiliated to the Council for the Indian School Certificate Examinations (CISCE). It has a motto of "Upward Onward".

History
7 January 1955 saw the beginning of the Little Convent within the colony of the F.R.I. in a little house called "Hill Bungalow". It was through the negotiation of Sister Clarissa with Rev. Fr. Jacque and Fr. Sharp that laid the first step to the foundation of the Apostolic Carmel in Digwadih.

On 7 January 1955 four sisters – Mother Violette (first Superior of Carmel Convent and first Head Mistress of Carmel School), Sister Terese, Marie Helene and Rosaline, arrived for the foundation of Carmel Convent and School, Digwadih. The correspondence of Directors of F.R.I. Dr. Whiltaker and Dr. Lahiri with Fathers Jacque and Sharp brought about the acceptance of invitation to start a school in the F.R.I. Colony for the education of girls in Digwadih. The Sisters received support from Mani, the administrator, and Mr. Mahadevan, a member of the school committee.

The next step was to take over the existing school in the colony, conducted by F.R.I. staff. Four lay teachers on the staff managed classes I – III (20 children). The classes were conducted in one of the F.R.I. Bungalows. Thanks to F.R.I., who together with the donations from the public laid the foundation for a school building on their own land within the colony and saw to its completion in June 1957. The spacious school building could accommodate 400 children ( classes I – VII ).

In 1996, the uneven forest land in the High School had been levelled and extended. Friends from the Tatas and the B.C.C.L. made it possible.

In December 1997, an open air programme was organized on the new levelled playground.

The school is under the ICSE Board, New Delhi. It has obtained the Minority Rights.

Social concern
It has a regular Hindi School for the underprivileged children. They also have ‘Each one, teach one’ Project, helped by the students of Class IX of Carmel School Digwadih.

Past principals

External links
 http://www.carmeldelhi.com
 http://www.carmelbhopal.net
 http://carmelconvent.org
 Official website
 https://web.archive.org/web/20130624040041/http://carmelschooldigwadih.org/

Carmelite educational institutions
Primary schools in India
High schools and secondary schools in Jharkhand
Christian schools in Jharkhand
Education in Dhanbad district
Educational institutions established in 1955
1955 establishments in Bihar